The Coombs Covered Bridge is a wooden covered bridge which carries Coombs Bridge Road over the Ashuelot River in northern Winchester, New Hampshire.  It was built in 1837, and is one of the state's small number of surviving 19th-century covered bridges.  It was listed on the National Register of Historic Places in 1976.

Description and history
The Coombs Covered Bridge is located roughly midway between the village centers of Winchester and Swanzey, carrying Coombs Bridge Road across the Ashuelot River between New Hampshire Route 10 and Old Swanzey Road. Its Town lattice trusses are sheathed in vertical board siding, and it is covered by a metal gabled roof. The end portals have segmented-arch openings, and there are banded openings on the side walls to admit light.

The bridge was built in 1837, less than twenty years after Ithiel Town patented the truss type used in it.  It was probably built by either Anthony Coombs or Anthony Coombs, Jr., who lived nearby.  The bridge was extensively renovated in 1969, and again in 1997.

See also

List of New Hampshire covered bridges
National Register of Historic Places listings in Cheshire County, New Hampshire
List of bridges on the National Register of Historic Places in New Hampshire

References

Covered bridges on the National Register of Historic Places in New Hampshire
Bridges completed in 1837
Wooden bridges in New Hampshire
Tourist attractions in Cheshire County, New Hampshire
Bridges in Cheshire County, New Hampshire
National Register of Historic Places in Cheshire County, New Hampshire
Winchester, New Hampshire
Road bridges on the National Register of Historic Places in New Hampshire
Lattice truss bridges in the United States